PHO or pho may refer to:
 Phở, a Vietnamese noodle soup
 Primary health organisation, New Zealand
 Public health observatory, UK
 Potentially hazardous object, an asteroid or comet that could potentially collide with Earth
 Pho regulon, a bacterial phosphate regulatory mechanism

See also
 Pho4, a basic helix-loop-helix transcription factor
 Phos, a genus of sea snails